Claudio Nicolás Calderón Ávila (born 5 January 1986) is a Chilean former footballer.

He played for Coquimbo Unido.

External links
 
 
 Claudio Calderón at Playmaker

1986 births
Living people
Footballers from Santiago
Chilean footballers
Chilean expatriate footballers
Unión Española footballers
Ñublense footballers
Raya2 Expansión players 
Curicó Unido footballers
Cobresal footballers
San Marcos de Arica footballers
Puerto Montt footballers
Unión Temuco footballers
Deportes Temuco footballers
Coquimbo Unido footballers
Chilean Primera División players
Ascenso MX players
Primera B de Chile players
Chilean expatriate sportspeople in Mexico
Expatriate footballers in Mexico
Association football defenders